Lago della Meja is a lake in the Province of Cuneo, Piedmont, Italy.

Lakes of Piedmont
Province of Cuneo